Omar Nejjary is a retired Moroccan footballer. He usually played as midfielder.

Nejjary spent his entire career at Raja Casablanca and played for his club at the 2000 FIFA Club World Cup.

References

1972 births
Living people
Moroccan footballers
Footballers from Casablanca
Morocco international footballers
Raja CA players
Association football midfielders